First Presbyterian Church, also known as Rock Church, is a historic Presbyterian church located at 212 E. North Street in Marshall, Saline County, Missouri, United States. It was built between 1871 and 1873, and is a one-story Gothic Revival style yellow sandstone building.  It features pointed arch windows and a corner bell tower.

It was added to the National Register of Historic Places in 1977.

References

Presbyterian churches in Missouri
Churches on the National Register of Historic Places in Missouri
Gothic Revival church buildings in Missouri
Churches completed in 1873
Buildings and structures in Saline County, Missouri
National Register of Historic Places in Saline County, Missouri